Buxton Football Club is a football club based in Buxton, Derbyshire, England.

History
The club was established in autumn 1877 as an offshoot of the local cricket club, playing their first match on 27 October 1877. In 1891 they joined the Combination. They finished bottom of the league in 1895–96 and left at the end of the 1898–99 season, when they switched to the Manchester League. They were runners-up in 1904–05 but spent most of the next seven seasons in lower mid-table, finishing second-from-bottom on three occasions, before the league was disbanded in 1912.

Buxton rejoined the Manchester League when it was re-established in 1920, and considered applying to join the new Football League Third Division North when it was formed in 1921, although they did not submit a bid. They were Manchester League runners-up in 1928–29 and 1929–30 and League Cup winners in 1925–26 and 1926–27. After winning the league in 1931–32, they joined the Cheshire County League. After World War II they were runners-up in 1946–47, and in 1951–52 they reached the first round of the FA Cup for the first time. They beat Rawmarsh Welfare 4–1 in the first round and overcame Football League side Aldershot 4–3 at Silverlands in the second,  before losing 2–0 at Second Division Doncaster Rovers in the third round.

In 1958–59 Buxton reached the first round of the FA Cup again, and after beating Crook Town 4–1 in the first round, they lost 6–1 at Accrington Stanley in the second. Another first-round appearance in 1962–63 resulted in a 3–1 defeat at Barrow in a replay. The season also saw them finish as runners-up in the Cheshire County League, and they went on to win the league title in 1972–73, earning promotion to the Northern Premier League. When the league gained a second division in 1987, Buxton were placed in the Premier Division, where they remained until finishing bottom in 1996–97, resulting in relegation to Division One. After finishing bottom of Division One the following season, they were relegated to the Premier Division of the Northern Counties East League.

In 2005–06 Buxton won the Northern Counties East League Premier Division, earning promotion back to Division One of the Northern Premier League. The following season saw them crowned champions again, resulting in promotion to the Northern Premier League's Premier Division. They finished fifth in their first season back in the division, qualifying for the promotion play-offs, in which they beat Witton Albion 6–5 on penalties after a 1–1 draw in the semi-finals, before losing the final 2–0 to Gateshead. In 2021–22 the club defeated York City 1–0 in the first round of the FA Cup before losing 1–0 at home to Morecambe of EFL League One. They finished the league season as champions of the Premier Division of the Northern Premier League and were promoted to the National League North.

Ground
Buxton originally played at the Park, a ground shared with the cricket club, and later played at Cote Lane, London Road and Green Lane before moving to the Silverlands in 1884. The site was originally a field owned by the club's first captain, Frank Drewry. The opening match was held on 1 November 1884, a Derbyshire Cup match against Bakewell, which Buxton won 2–0.

Cover was provided for spectators in 1890 (proposals to build a separate pavilion for working-class supporters were not taken forward), at the same time as dressing rooms were built. A wooden stand was erected on one side of the pitch and replaced by the current main stand in 1965, which later had seats from Maine Road added to it. On the opposite side of the pitch is the Popular Side covered terrace. The end behind one goal has a covered terrace, with the other end empty. The ground currently has a capacity of 4,000, of which 490 is seated and 2,500 covered.

Non-playing staff

Honours
 
Northern Premier League
Premier Division champions 2021–22
Division One champions 2006–07
President's Cup winners 1981–82, 2006–07
Northern Counties East League
Champions 2005–06
President's Cup winners 2004–05, 2005–06
Cheshire County League
Champions 1972–73
League Cup winners 1956–57, 1957–58, 1968–69
Manchester League
Champions 1931–32
League Cup winners 1925–26, 1926–27
Derbyshire Senior Cup
Winners 1938–39, 1945–46, 1956–57, 1959–60, 1971–72, 1980–81, 1985–86, 1986–87, 2008–09, 2011–12

Records
Record attendance: 6,000 vs Barrow, FA Cup first round, 1962–63
Most appearances: David Bainbridge, 642
Most goals: Mark Reed, 251 in 469 games
Record transfer fee paid: £5,000 to Hyde United for Gary Walker, 1989
Record transfer fee received: £16,500 from Rotherham United for Ally Pickering, 1989
Best FA Cup performance: Third round, 1951–52
Best FA Trophy performance: Quarter finals, 1970–71, 1971–72
Best FA Vase performance: Fifth round, 2005–06

See also
Buxton F.C. players
Buxton F.C. managers

References

External links

Official website

 
Football
Football clubs in England
Football clubs in Derbyshire
Association football clubs established in 1877
1877 establishments in England
The Combination
Manchester Football League
Northern Premier League clubs
Northern Counties East Football League
Cheshire County League clubs
National League (English football) clubs